was a province of Japan, located in Kinai, corresponding to present-day Nara Prefecture in Honshū. It was also called . Yamato consists of two characters, 大 "great", and 和 "Wa". At first, the name was written with one different character, but due to its offensive connotation, for about ten years after 737, this was revised to use more desirable characters (see Names of Japan). The final revision was made in the second year of the Tenpyō-hōji era (c. 758). It is classified as a great province in the Engishiki.

The Yamato Period in the history of Japan refers to the late Kofun Period (c. 250–538) and Asuka Period (538–710). Japanese archaeologists and historians emphasize the fact that during the early Kofun Period the Yamato Kingship was in close contention with other regional powers, such as Kibi Province near present-day Okayama Prefecture. Around the 6th century, the local chieftainship gained national control and established the Imperial court in Yamato Province.

The battleship , the flagship of the Japanese Combined Fleet during World War II, was named after this ancient province.

Capital
During the Kofun period (300 to 538) and the Asuka period, many palace capitals were located in Kashihara, Asuka, and Sakurai. Yamato was the first central government of the unified country in the Kofun period. Heijō-kyō capital was placed in Nara City during the Nara period.

In the 14th century, the capital of the Southern Court was established in Yoshino and Anou.

Temples
The provincial temple for monks is popularly thought to have been Tōdai-ji, but it may have in fact been a different one in Kashihara. The one for nuns was Hokke-ji.

The primary shrine was Sakurai's Ōmiwa Shrine, but there have been no records stating as such found at the shrine itself. There were no secondary shrines. The sōja (or principal Shinto shrine in the province) was Kokufu Shrine (Takatori, Takaichi, Nara).

Kami of Yamato
Minamoto no Shigetoki
Minamoto no Suetō
Utsunomiya Nobufusa
Oda Hidanaga
Oda Toshisada
Oda Tatsusada
Oda Tatsukatsu
Mitsuki Naoyori
Honjō Fusanaga
Tōyama Kagetō
Jushii-ge Nakai Masakiyo
Jushii-ge Matsudaira Tomonori
Jushii-ge Matsudaira Naotsune
Jugoi-ge Kanō Hisachika
Jushii-ge Matsudaira Naonobu
Jushii-ge Matsudaira Tsunenori
Jushii-ge Matsudaira Naoyoshi

Districts

Domains
Yagyū Domain
Kōriyama Domain
Koizumi Domain
Yanagimoto Domain
Kaijū Domain / Shibamura Domain
Kujira Domain
Uda-Matsuyama Domain
Takatori Domain
Okidome Domain
Tatsuta Domain
Tawaramoto Domain
Kishida Domain
Yamato-Shinjō Domain
Gose Domain
Yamato-Gojō Domain

See also
Yamataikoku
Yoshino Province
List of Provinces of Japan
List of Han
Yamato period

Yamato people (Japanese)
Yamato-damashii - 'the Japanese spirit'
Thirteen Buddhist Sites of Yamato

Notes

References
 Nussbaum, Louis-Frédéric and Käthe Roth (2005).  Japan encyclopedia. Cambridge: Harvard University Press. ;  OCLC 58053128

External links 

 Murdoch's map of provinces, 1903

 
Former provinces of Japan